Larkin Community Hospital (LCH) is a for-profit 146-bed general medical, surgical and psychiatric teaching hospital. In the last year with available data, LCH had about 7,523 emergency department visits and 5,792 admissions. Physicians at the hospital performed 794 inpatient and 739 outpatient surgeries.

LCH is the only hospital in Miami-Dade County with an Area of Critical Need designation by the Florida Board of Medicine. The hospital is accredited by the Joint Commission on Accreditation of Healthcare Organizations (JCAHO).

The hospital is part of Larkin Health System, an integrated healthcare delivery system accredited by the Joint Commission with locations in South Miami, Hialeah and Hollywood, Florida. This network of acute care hospitals provide a complete continuum of healthcare services, including a full range of inpatient and outpatient services, and home health agencies in Miami-Dade and Broward County.

History 
In 2013 LCH was named Top Urban Hospital by The Leapfrog Group.

In March 2014, LCH began accepting applicants for its new Advance Education in General Dentistry (AEGD) residency program.

In February 2016, Larkin Community Hospital acquired Palm Springs General Hospital now called Larkin Community Hospital Palm Springs Campus, located at 1475 W 49th Pl, Hialeah, FL 33012.

Services
The Miami Neuroscience Center at Larkin offers Gamma Knife® therapy. Gamma Knife is a non-invasive neurological procedure used to treat brain tumors, head and neck cancer, and neurological conditions such as trigeminal neuralgia and arteriovenous malformations.

The Dermatology Center at Larkin provides care for dermatological conditions, such as immunobullous disorders, collagen vascular diseases and papulosquamous disorders. The center also treats cutaneous T-cell lymphoma, and chronic graft vs host disease. This center is equipped with photopheresis, hydrotherapy and phototherapy units.

The Larkin Outpatient Multi Specialty Center offers services in a variety of specialities, including: neuromusculoskeletal medicine, sports medicine, orthopedics, cardiology, hematology, and oncology.

Graduate medical education
Larkin Community Hospital operates a number of residency training and fellowship programs for newly graduated physicians.  The residencies train physicians specializing in: dermatology, internal medicine, neurology, ophthalmology, physical medicine and rehabilitation, psychiatry, radiology, family medicine, gastroenterology, rheumatology, hematology & oncology, and surgery. All programs are accredited by the Accreditation Council for Graduate Medical Education (ACGME). LCH also operates podiatry and dentistry residency programs. As of 2019, the hospital had 350 medical residents in 30 different programs.

The resident physicians at the Larkin Community Hospital obtain training and experience working at affiliated training sites such as:
 Nicklaus Children's Hospital, Miami, FL
 Nationwide Children's Hospital, Columbus, Ohio
 Borinquen Health Care Center, Miami, FL
 Miami Beach Community Health Center, Miami, FL
 Community Health of South Florida (CHI), Miami, FL
 Jessie Trice Health Community Health Center, Miami, FL

Campus
Larkin Community Hospital is located at 7031 Southwest 62nd Avenue South Miami, Florida 33143.   Larkin Community Hospital acquired Palm Springs General Hospital in 2016, which is now the Palm Springs Campus of Larkin Community Hospital.

In April 2013, LCH purchased a  parcel of land that the hospital intends to use for a new osteopathic medical school campus. LCH also plans to move its current nursing school to that new campus, and open future programs in pharmacy and dentistry.

See also
 Larkin University, whose startup was initiated by Larkin Community Hospital but which is a separate, non-profit organization

References 

Hospitals in Florida
Neuroscience research centers in the United States
Research institutes in Florida
Teaching hospitals
Teaching hospitals in Florida